is a train station in Miyazaki City, Miyazaki Prefecture, Japan.

Lines

Layout 
The station, which is unstaffed, consists of a side platform serving a single track at grade. The station building, a modern concrete structure, is unstaffed and serves only as a waiting room.

Adjacent stations

History
On 21 March 1939, the station was renamed Kodomonokuni. The station closed when the Miyazaki Railway ceased operations on 1 July 1962. Subsequently, Japanese National Railways (JNR) extended its then Shibushi Line north from  towards Minami-Miyazaki on the same route and reopened Kodomonokuni as an intermediate station on 8 May 1963. The route was renamed the Nichinan Line on the same day. With the privatization of JNR on 1 April 1987, the station came under the control of JR Kyushu.

Passenger statistics
In fiscal 2016, the station was used by an average of 39 passengers (boarding only) per day.

Surrounding area
Kodomonokuni Amusement Park

See also
List of railway stations in Japan

References

External links
Kodomonokuni (JR Kyushu)

Railway stations in Miyazaki Prefecture
Railway stations in Japan opened in 1923
Miyazaki (city)